Abdus Salam (1942 – 17 March 2011) is a Jatiya Party (Ershad) politician and the former member of parliament of the then Jamalpur-7 and Sherpur-2.

Early life 
Abdus Salam was born 1942 in Sherpur.

Career 
Abdus Salam started teaching in Sunamganj and Ashek Mahmud College in Jamalpur. He was the Deputy Minister of Home Affairs during the tenure of President Ziaur Rahman and Sattar, and the Minister of Agriculture during the tenure of Hussain Muhammad Ershad in 1986.

He was elected to parliament from the then Jamalpur-7 as a Bangladesh Nationalist Party candidate in 1979. He was elected to parliament from Sherpur-2 as a Jatiya Party candidate in 1986 and 1988.

Death 
Abdus Salam died on 17 March 2011.

References 

Jatiya Party politicians
Living people
3rd Jatiya Sangsad members
4th Jatiya Sangsad members
1942 births